Wola Dalsza  is a village in the administrative district of Gmina Białobrzegi, within Łańcut County, Subcarpathian Voivodeship, in south-eastern Poland.

References

Wola Dalsza